Siboniso Conco (born 2 March 1996) is a South African professional soccer player who plays for Maritzburg United. He made his international debut for South Africa in 2019.

References

1996 births
Living people
South African soccer players
Association football midfielders
Lamontville Golden Arrows F.C. players
Maritzburg United F.C. players
South Africa international soccer players
South African Premier Division players
People from Empangeni
Soccer players from KwaZulu-Natal